Edward Thompson (25 June 1881 – 15 July 1954) was an English railway engineer, and was Chief Mechanical Engineer of the London and North Eastern Railway between 1941 and 1946. Edward Thompson was born at Marlborough, Wiltshire on 25 June 1881. He was the son of an assistant master at Marlborough College. He was educated at Marlborough before taking the Mechanical Science Tripos at Pembroke College, Cambridge, earning a third class degree. Thompson's academic background contrasts with that of his predecessor Nigel Gresley, who had also attended Marlborough, but then gained practical experience as a pupil at Horwich Works.

Career

NER, GNR, LNER 
After graduation Thompson worked in both industry and the railways for a while. By 1910 he was assistant divisional locomotive superintendent on the North Eastern Railway (NER), in which capacity he gave evidence at the inquiry into the fatal accident between two goods trains at Darlington on 15 November 1910. In 1912 he was appointed Carriage and Wagon Superintendent for the Great Northern Railway (GNR). He served with the Armed Forces during WW1, and was twice mentioned in dispatches. Upon demobilization, he returned to the railways, alternating between the wagon works at Darlington and Doncaster (and consequently between the North Eastern and Great Northern respectively). He became Workshop Manager at Stratford Works in 1930 and was able to make significant improvements although the works layout prevented major changes there.

Had Grouping not taken place in 1923, Thompson would have effectively become CME of the North Eastern in 1933 upon the retirement of A.C Stamer, who had been Assistant CME to Raven at the North Eastern, but in the end being Works Manager at Stratford was Thompson's final post before becoming Chief Mechanical Engineer (CME) of the London and North Eastern Railway (LNER) in 1941 after the death of Nigel Gresley. Thompson was to hold the CME post for 5 years. History shows that Gresley and Thompson disagreed on a number of matters. Thompson had a number of incidents with Gresley, and given the previous heated debate between Gresley and Thompson's father-in-law, Sir Vincent Raven, it is probable that there was a degree of petulance about Thompson's choice for his prototype A1/1 engine, namely No.4470 Great Northern, both for its name (that of NER rival company the GNR) and for it being Gresley's first Pacific, though opinion on this is heavily divided. Another incident is noted by O.S. Nock that Gresley reprimanded Thompson for interfering in the actions of a driver on an engine which had failed in service.

The biggest dispute between them was on the Gresley conjugated valve gear for 3-cylinder engines. This valve gear arrangement worked well during peacetime but experienced problems due to poor maintenance during the Second World War, giving Thompson some justification for his criticism of the design. Thompson himself described the conjugated valve gear as Gresleys only real failure, but noted that Gresley himself would not admit to any failure in his own work.

Gresley's passing was very unexpected, and the LNER had no immediate successor in mind. The LNER board of directors first requested permission from the Southern Railway to approach their CME, O.V.S. Bulleid, who had been Gresley's assistant until joining the Southern four years previously. Permission was granted, but he declined the offer. J.F. Harrison, the man later largely responsible for the design of No.71000 "Duke of Gloucester", was the popular choice. However, at 42 years old, it was considered inappropriate for someone so young to take the post. The LNER board then turned to Arthur Peppercorn for the CME role, but Thompson held seniority amongst other LNER officials and used this political experience to sidestep Peppercorn and take the title of CME.

Temperament 

According to Col. H.C.B Rogers (who in turn cites a number of the LNER Engineers, Harrison, Smedley, Spencer et al.), Thompson possessed an ill temper towards his colleagues and was notoriously difficult to deal with. The Drawing Office at Doncaster had full height panelling on the walls of the corridors, to which Thompson had full-length windows fitted, so that he could see all that was going on and what people were doing. Those who did not agree with him did not work with him for long. He possessed a strong dislike of his predecessor, and changed a lot of Gresley designs to his own ideas, many of which lacked foundation, and in a balanced environment would not have been considered acceptable.

He was a quietly-spoken man, but was extremely sensitive about it, and became infamous for losing his temper should anyone ask him to repeat himself. He was largely intolerant of anyone who questioned his ideas, which seemed to be an insecurity caused by his time working under Gresley. Thompson was a regular visitor to Gresley with suggested initiatives, but was often rebuffed in front of the workforce because Gresley thought that many of his proposals were not feasible. In time, Thompson was to take these rebuffs from Gresley and dish them back to his team with ever-greater severity. A number of Gresley's assistants, such as Spencer, to name one, were dispatched to areas of the LNER considered as backwaters in comparison to Doncaster and Darlington.

Men found him notoriously difficult to work with, but the women in his workforce often seemed to be able to get around him. He had an uncanny ability to charm those he wanted to or needed to, but he could also upset matters very quickly too. J.F. Harrison reported that meetings dealing with the railway unions would often have to be repeated after Thompson had left the room, in order to smooth ruffled feathers.

His appearance was always immaculate, and his office stationery was all gold plated, a perceived symbol of his wealth. He was said to own a great many suits, shirts and ties, and prided himself on not having a hair out of place.

Thompson himself felt that Gresley had deliberately held him back in his career and ignored his advice. He attributed this to the fact that he married the daughter of Sir Vincent Raven for whom Gresley harboured a deep antipathy.

In Sir Vincent Raven: North Eastern Railway Locomotive Engineer, Terry L Price writes that Thompson's wife Guen died in 1938, and he was subsequently very lonely after her passing.

Standardisation programme 
When Thompson was appointed CME of the LNER he started a much needed standardisation programme. This programme demonstrated Thompson's dislike for Gresley's engineering practices. Many notable Gresley designs were rebuilt under this practice including the P2 Mikado, V2 Prairie and A1 Pacific locomotives. The A1 chosen for rebuilding was Great Northern, which was the original Gresley prototype for the class. The standardisation was a further reflection on the difference between Gresley and Thompson. The LNER had never been in a position to undergo large-scale re-equipment programmes such as those afforded by the LMS, and for much of its existence, the LNER used a large fleet of pre-grouping locomotives for everything except the very top-flight services. As such, Gresley believed that rebuilding and improving was usually enough in a lot of cases, and where it was not, he designed a locomotive specifically for the job. Examples of each are the D16/3 Claud Hamiltons (rebuilt), the B12/3 (re-boilered and new valve gear) and his K4 (built for the West Highland Line) and P2 (for the Aberdeen to Edinburgh route). Thompson, having spent a time introducing a conveyor system into the stores at York and Doncaster, was an advocate of a small variety of classes, and spent time during his tenure as CME in developing a list of classes either rebuilt to his standard (like the B2, A2/2, K1/1 etc.) or built new to standard designs (the B1, L1 etc.).

The standardisation centred largely around the B1 boiler, which had been developed from that on the B17, 20" cylinders (a layover from the original A1 class's outside cylinders/K2 Cylinders, but with 10" piston valves), and a range of standard wheel sizes (among them 5 ft 8 in, 6 ft 2 in and 6 ft 8 in). A number of intermediate 4-6-0 classes, such as the B16, B17 and GCR types, were rebuilt into outside-cylindered classes, where wheel size was the only major varying detail.

The programme had the desired effect of reducing the variety of LNER classes, and allowed the withdrawal of a number of worn-out pre-grouping classes, but a good many of the rebuilds and in fact the new builds had design flaws, so that the problems Thompson solved for the Maintenance Dept. were replaced by new ones for the Operating Dept.

Thompson's designs 
Pacific rebuilds
Thompson criticised many of Gresley's practices, but equivalent comment can be made about many of Thompson's designs. Upon taking up his post, Thompson tried to convince the LNER hierarchy of the need to rebuild the Gresley Pacific and Mikado classes. The Directors of the LNER, having witnessed a Gresley A4 take the World Speed Record for steam, were sceptical about this, so Thompson researched as many middle big-end bearing failures on the LNER as he could find, attributing them to the design of the conjugated motion, even garnering outside opinion from the LMS. Despite roundly criticizing the Gresley motion, his Pacific rebuilds were not the best designs. They retained three cylinders, but with divided drive and 3 independent sets of Walschaerts valve gear. Thompson attached great importance to having the connecting rods equal in length, which was in fact unnecessary. As a result, the outside cylinders were placed behind the front bogie with the inside cylinder well forward. This gave the engine an unnecessarily long wheelbase, created long exhaust channels, generated vibration and encouraged flexing and fracture of the locomotive frames. All of his Pacifics were particularly prone to wheel slip owing to the high power output of the engine in relation to the adhesion factor. The engines were effective, and the design had materially less maintenance demand on the centre valve gear than the conjugated locomotives, but the positives were outweighed by the problems, which were of such significance that Thompson's engines were withdrawn and scrapped before many of their Gresley-designed forerunners. The Thompson Pacifics were ultimately more maintenance-intensive overall than the Gresley engines. Thompson omitted the "banjo dome" that had featured on the Gresley Pacifics since 1928. However, Thompson's successor, Arthur Peppercorn, revived the feature on the remaining batches of LNER Pacifics.

From a technical standpoint, a number of the features of the Thompson design were not considered as acceptable or reasoned principles, as they did not follow established locomotive consideration. Divided drive, although it did reduce the total stress/strain on the centre crank axle, did not lend itself to frame integrity, especially coupled with connecting rods of equal length, as the greatest point of rigidity in the frame structure itself, the cylinders, were no longer lined up. Locomotive frames are flexible to handle side-to-side twist, and even axial twist along their length, but fore-and-aft motion between the frames leads to bearing and joint failures. To maintain connecting rods of equal length required the inside cylinder to be placed as far forward as possible, and even so the outside cylinders were behind the rear axle of the front bogie, which was not LNER practice, and subsequently resulted in a very long wheelbase.

The front bogie itself was common with that on the B1, but was not sufficiently strong to control yawing of the Pacific classes, nor to straighten the engine out after a curve, and the Thompson A2's all had a poor reputation for being unwieldy, especially for rolling and yawing.

However, the steam circuit, which was based on that from the P2's and the A4's, was generally regarded as excellent, as were the 19" cylinders fitted to the later A2/3's: consequently, with their large boilers, the Thompson Pacifics had a reputation for being capable of very high speeds, often being able to hold speeds in excess of 90 mph. The steam circuit aspects of the engines were carried over into the Peppercorn designs.

Class L1
Thompson's class L1 Adriatic suburban tank locomotives were another unsuccessful design. They were powerful machines that should have been well-suited to their duties but their 5 ft 2 inch wheels were too small for fast outer suburban services and they quickly knocked themselves apart. The axle boxes suffered, water tanks split, oil pipes broke off, and crossheads wore rapidly.

Class B1
On the other hand, Thompson built one of the most successful LNER designs, the class B1 4-6-0, which was a simple two-cylinder design mixed traffic engine. The B1 was based loosely on Gresley's class B17. The prototype for the B1 was a B17/1 modified with a higher pressure boiler and with its centre cylinder removed. The design proved to be free-steaming, economical and simple to maintain, though some details caused issues in due course. The small amount of balancing of the reciprocating masses (in order to reduce hammer-blow) made for a rough ride and a significant degree of vibration in the cab, and eventually the reciprocating mass percentage was increased. More than 400 B1s were built between 1946 and 1952: British Railways continued B1 production after nationalisation. The Diagram 100A boiler used in the class formed the basis for the rebuilding of many pre-grouping classes, including the class O4 2-8-0 freight locos. The Thompson B1 equalled the LMS Black Five locomotives during the inter-regional exchange trials in the first year of British Railways. The B1 was also cheaper to build than the Black Five. The B1 had poor and very inconsistent ride quality, unlike the relatively smooth riding qualities of a number of Gresley designs, though it must be considered that fundamentally a locomotive with a rear truck/Cartazzi arrangement does generally ride better than one without, and even Gresley's classes reflected this. Poor riding remains  a characteristic of the two preserved B1s.

Other Rebuilds
Thompson also rebuilt a number of different Gresley locomotives, usually using the B1-derived boiler (in turn developed from the B17 type boiler) and 2 20" cylinders (derived from the early Gresley A1 engines). The Robinson 8K (LNER O4) was re-boilered and re-cylindered to create the class O1. Two B17's were rebuilt with 2 cylinders to create the prototypes for the B1 class, and later more B17s were converted. A K4 became the prototype K1/1 and a K3 became the K5. The K1/1 was a particularly unpopular engine: its name MacCailin Mor was not a good choice for the locality in which it worked, and after having its 3 cylinders replaced with 2, its performance endeared it even less to the local Scottish crews.

Coach design
Thompson improved passenger safety by introducing steel-bodied coaches to the LNER. Previously the LNER had Gresley-designed coaches, the most famous of which had teak bodies but by 1940s standards these were considered insufficiently safe in a collision. Therefore, during the Second World War Thompson designed new all-steel coaches that became a forerunner of British Railways Mark 1 design.

Proposed Pacific
Shortly before Thompson's retirement the LNER was short of express passenger locomotives so Thompson initiated plans for a new Pacific design, which he intended to be based on the rebuilt Great Northern. However the LNER design office, having received reports of Great Northern's performance in service, delayed completing the design of  the locomotive until Thompson had retired. Even then Thompson laid down a strict set of guidelines for the new locos. The new class (LNER Class A1) was finally designed under Thompson's successor Arthur Peppercorn, who disregarded almost all of Thompson's guidelines.

Locomotive list 
Thompson A1/1 4-6-2 (1945)
Thompson A2/1 4-6-2 (1944)
Thompson A2/2 4-6-2 (1943)
Thompson A2/3 4-6-2 (1946)
Thompson B1 4-6-0 (1942)
Thompson B3/3 4-6-0 (1943)
Thompson B16/3 4-6-0 (1944)
Thompson B2 4-6-0 (1945)
Thompson K1/1 2-6-0 (1945)
Thompson K5 2-6-0 (1945)
Thompson L1 2-6-4T (1945)
Thompson O1 2-8-0 (1944)
Thompson Q1 0-8-0 (1942)

Family 
Thompson was the son-in-law of Sir Vincent Raven, the final CME of the NER.

Retirement and death 
Thompson retired from the LNER in 1946 and died in 1954.

References

Citations

References 

1881 births
1954 deaths
English railway mechanical engineers
Locomotive builders and designers
People educated at Marlborough College
Alumni of Pembroke College, Cambridge
London and North Eastern Railway people